General Fortunato Maycotte Camero was a Mexican soldier who participated in the Mexican Revolution.

Fortunato was born in Progreso, Coahuila, on October 26, 1891, and baptised seven months after. His parents were Apuleyo Maycotte and Juana Camero. He became affiliated with the Maderism movement in 1910.

Constitutionalism 
In 1913, Maycotte joined the constitucionalistas forces, reaching the degree of General of Division. He was represented in the Convention of Aguascalientes in October 1914 by Juan Hernández. Faithful to Venustiano Carranza, he excelled in the fight against Pancho Villa in 1915. From June 26 to October 15, 1916, he was Governor of Durango.

Plan of Agua Prieta 
In 1920 he rebelled against Venustiano Carranza, adhering in Chilpancingo, Guerrero, to his former boss Álvaro Obregón, supporting the Plan of Agua Prieta.

In 1923, he supported the rebellion of Adolfo of the Huerta. After being defeated in the Battle of Palo Blanco, he was executed by firing squad on May 14, 1924.

References 

People from Coahuila
Executed Mexican people
Governors of Durango
Governors of Hidalgo (state)
Mexican people of French descent
Mexican people of Irish descent
1891 births
1924 deaths
People executed by Mexico by firing squad